Holo/Or is an international high-tech company, dedicated to the design, manufacturing and commercialization of new products based on diffractive optical elements (DOEs).

Company profile

Holo/Or is a leading company in the field of diffractive optical design and manufacture. Among the more popular products offered by Holo/Or are top-hat beam shapers, used in many industrial micro-machining and materials processing applications, high-power beam homogenizers/diffusers, beam splitters/samplers for multi-spot and power monitoring applications, and vortex lenses, used in metal-cutting and particle-trapping.

History

Holo/Or was founded in 1989 by Israel Grossinger., as a pioneer in the commercialization diffractive optical elements (DOEs). Back then, DOEs were found almost exclusively in various research institutes. Mr. Grossinger, occupying then the post of VP R&D at Indigo (sold later to HP), identified the commercial potential of this area. The first product manufactured at Holo/Or was the DWM (Dual Wavelength Module), proposed to a leading company in the field of medical laser systems, Coherent Medical. This was also the first commercial partnership of Holo/Or.

Holo/Or's Dual Wavelength lens was the first commercial DOE in the world. These lenses correct the strong chromatic and spherical aberrations between a CO2 laser and its red aiming, and unite both beams to a single diffraction-limited focal point beam, by the use of a diffractive surface pattern. This product continues to be used in surgical laser systems and FTIR systems.

The company has recorded several international patents. in various applications such as: IOL (Intra-ocular Lenses), Fundus cameras, hair coloring diagnostics, guiding systems, portable scanners and aesthetic laser treatment.

References

External links

Israeli Industry Center
OSA The optical society
Eye & Contact Lens: October 1996 Volume 22 Issue 4 Clinical Assessment of Holo-Or Trifocal Diffractive Contact Lenses
Objective and subjective assessment of a new diffractive trifocal contact lens Proc. SPIE 2971, 134 (1997); 

Ness Ziona
Optics manufacturing companies
Electronics companies of Israel
Companies established in 1989
Israeli brands